Alan Myers (December 29, 1954 – June 24, 2013) was an American rock drummer whose music career spanned more than 30 years. He came to prominence in the late 1970s as the third and most prominent drummer of the new wave band Devo, replacing Jim Mothersbaugh.

Early years
Alan Myers was born in 1954, in Akron, Ohio, and came from a jazz background. He graduated from Firestone High School in 1973. In 1976, he met Bob Mothersbaugh in a café in West Akron and went to the house Bob and Gerald Casale were renting for an audition. Alan was Jewish and had been playing percussion since at least junior high school.

Career

Devo
In early 1970, Bob Lewis and Gerald Casale formed the idea of the "devolution" of the human race after Casale's friend Jeffrey Miller was killed by Ohio National Guardsmen firing on a student demonstration. Myers joined Devo in 1976, replacing Jim Mothersbaugh following his departure and played on a conventional, acoustic drum kit. After the band underwent a few line-up changes, Myers became part of the most popular five-piece incarnation, which included the Casale brothers: Gerald and Bob ("Bob 2") and the Mothersbaugh brothers: Mark and Bob ("Bob 1") and played on Devo's first six studio albums. Myers was the youngest member of the band. In 1981, Myers with Devo served as Toni Basil's backing band on Word of Mouth, her debut album, which included versions of three Devo songs, recorded with Basil's singing lead.

Myers became discontented as Devo began to add drum machines to some of their songs. New Traditionalists featured them for the first time, and most of the music on their next album Oh, No! It's Devo was created by electronic means, while Shout was made almost entirely using the Fairlight CMI digital sampling synthesizer.

According to the book We Are Devo, Myers cited a lack of creative fulfilment as his reason for leaving the band. Since Devo's move to Los Angeles, California, in the late 1970s, he'd felt his role greatly reduced partly due to the use of drum machines. He left even though Gerald Casale had begged him not to.

Among all of Devo's drummers, Myers is the one most associated with the band. In 1987, Devo reformed with new drummer David Kendrick, formerly of Sparks, to replace Myers.

Myers and the other Devo members were part of the Church of the SubGenius.

Other work
After he had left Devo, Myers went to work as an electrical contractor, but also remained active in the Los Angeles music scene. He recorded a demo with Babooshka, a band that was his girlfriend Greta Ionita's creation, using live drums as well as electronic percussion similar to his last two albums with Devo. Myers also played drums with the Asian-themed pop band Jean Paul Yamamoto. In 2005, he founded the band Skyline Electric which played monthly shows in art galleries and clubs in Los Angeles. The line-up at the time of Myers death included his wife, Christine (Sugiyama) Myers, and an assortment of other experimental musicians. In 2010, Myers began playing in the live ensemble of musical project Swahili Blonde with his daughter, Laena Geronimo (Myers-Ionita).

Death
On June 24, 2013, Myers died at the age of 58, in Los Angeles, California, due to stomach cancer. News reports at the time of his death incorrectly cited a brain tumor as the cause. Myers' death was first reported on Facebook by his friend Ralph Carney, a jazz musician who knew him in Devo's hometown of Akron, Ohio. His death came a month before the release of Something Else for Everybody, outtakes from Devo's ninth album "Something For Everybody".

Gerald Casale tweeted that Myers was "the most incredible drummer I had the privilege to play with for 10 years. Losing him was like losing an arm." Josh Freese tweeted that Myers was "1 of [his] all time favs. An underrated/brilliant drummer. Such an honor playing his parts w/Devo. Godspeed Human Metronome."

On June 28, 2013, Skyline Electric performed a tribute to Myers at Human Resources Los Angeles in Los Angeles's Chinatown.

Discography

Filmography 

 Devo's The Men Who Make the Music (1979, actor, self)
 Devo's The Complete Truth About De-Evolution (2003, actor, self)

References

External links

1954 births
2013 deaths
20th-century American drummers
Devo members
American new wave musicians
American synth-pop musicians
American punk rock drummers
American male drummers
American rock drummers
American SubGenii
Musicians from Ohio
New wave drummers
Date of birth unknown
Deaths from stomach cancer
Jewish American musicians
Jewish rock musicians
Deaths from cancer in California
21st-century American drummers
Jews in punk rock
American post-punk musicians